Talho is a settlement in the central part of the island of São Nicolau, Cape Verde. It is located in the valley of Ribeira Brava, 1 km west of the city Ribeira Brava. In 2010 its population was 308. It is part of the municipality of Ribeira Brava and the parish of Nossa Senhora do Rosário.

See also
List of villages and settlements in Cape Verde

References

Villages and settlements in São Nicolau, Cape Verde
Ribeira Brava, Cape Verde